Protollin is a drug initially formulated as a vaccine adjuvant. It is composed of lipopolysaccharides derived from the Shigella flexneri or Pleisiomonas shigelloides bacterium combined with hydrophobic outer membrane proteins derived from Neisseria meningitidis. 

On November 16, 2021, Brigham and Women's Hospital announced that it was beginning a Phase I clinical trial of Protollin as a nasally-delivered vaccine to activate the body's immune response against amyloid proteins that form in the brain and are thought to contribute to the symptoms of Alzheimer's disease.

References 

Protollin
Adjuvants
Treatment of Alzheimer's disease